Yahya Al-Musalem (born 7 January 1987) is a Saudi Arabian footballer who plays as a defender.

References

1987 births
Living people
Saudi Arabian footballers
Al-Raed FC players
Al Hilal SFC players
Al-Wehda Club (Mecca) players
Saudi First Division League players
Saudi Professional League players
Association football defenders